Abai Bölekbaiūly Tasbolatov (born 21 September 1951) is a Kazakh politician, lieutenant-general of the Armed Forces of Kazakhstan, commander of the Republican Guard from 2006 to 2011, and a member of the Mazhilis since 2012.

Biography
Born in the village of Nikolaevka, Tasbolatov graduated from the Military Institute of the Kazakh Ground Forces in 1973. Until 1980, he served as the commander of a platoon, then a company of the Alma-Ata Higher Combined Arms Command School. From 1980 to 1983, he was a student at the Frunze Military Academy. In 1983, Tasbolatov became a teacher at the Military Institute of the Kazakh Ground Force where he then served as a battalion commander from 1986 to 1991. That same year, Tasbolatov became a Senior Lecturer.

From 1991 to 1992, he was the head of the department of military educational institutions and pre-conscription training of the headquarters of the State Defense Committee of Kazakhstan. From 1992 to 1997, Tabsolatov served as the head of the Military Institute of the Kazakh Ground Forces. In 1997, he became the head of the Military Academy of the Armed Forces of Kazakhstan.

In 2000, Tasbolatov graduated from the Military Academy of the General Staff of the Armed Forces of Russia.

From 2002 to 2006, he served as Deputy Minister of Defense of Kazakhstan.

From 23 January 2006 to 23 November 2011, Tasbolatov was the commander of the Republican Guard.

In 2007, he passed refresher courses at the Lee Kuan Yew School of Public Policy in the National University of Singapore.

Tasbolatov was elected as a member of the Mazhilis in the 2012 Kazakh legislative election in the Nur Otan party list. After Dariga Nazarbayeva was appointed as the member of the Senate of Kazakhstan, Tasbolatov succeeded her as the deputy chair of the Mazhilis from 11 September 2015, until the Parliament's dissolution on 20 January 2016. On 25 March 2016, he became the member of the Committee on International Affairs, Defense and Security of the Mazhilis.

References

Kazakhstani politicians
1951 births
Living people